"Segne, Vater, diese Gaben" (Bless, Father, these gifts) is a Christian hymn. The authors of text and melody are unknown. It is meant to be sung as a round. The song, which is often used for a prayer before a meal, has appeared in German hymnals and songbooks. It is regarded as a song of the genre Neues Geistliches Lied (NGL), and has been used in schools and events for young people.

History 
It is unknown who created the text, of one line followed by a twofold Amen, and the melody of "Segne, Vater, diese Gaben". The song is a prayer to bless gifts in general, but is mostly used as a prayer before a meal, saying grace. It is a round for two voices. The song was included in the 2013 German Catholic hymnal Gotteslob as GL 88, in the section Tischgebete (Grace), also with an alternate text: "Dank dir, Vater, für die Gaben" (Thank you, Father, for the gifts). It is regarded as a song of the genre Neues Geistliches Lied (NGL), from the 20th century. It has been recommended for use in elementary schools, and is listed among successful in youth services. The song is part of the collection Kinder-Kirchen-Hits (Children's Church Hits), a songbook aimed at children in kindergarten, elementary schools, and for services for children and young people.

The first line is the title of a collection of prayers around a meal edited by Stephan Schaefer, and published by Verlag Neue Stadt in 2012. The same publishing house added a selection of graces in pocket format by Gabriele Hartl, titled Segne, Vater, diese Gaben. Tischgebete, in 2021.

References

External links 
 Burkhard Knipping: Beständiger Segen (in German) Diocese of Cologne 2022

German Christian hymns
20th-century hymns in German
Songwriter unknown